Chromium(III) sulfate usually refers to the inorganic compounds with the formula Cr2(SO4)3.x(H2O), where x can range from 0 to 18. Additionally, ill-defined but commercially important "basic chromium sulfates" are known. These salts are usually either violet or green solids that are soluble in water. It is commonly used in tanning leather.

Chromium(III) sulfates
Three chromium(III) sulfates are well characterized:
Anhydrous chromium(III) sulfate, Cr2(SO4)3, (CAS #10101-53-8) is a violet solid that dissolves in water upon addition of a reducing agent, which generates chromium(II) sulfates.
Hydrated chromium(III) sulfate, Cr2(SO4)3·18H2O, (CAS #13520-66-6) is a violet solid that readily dissolves in water to give the metal aquo complex, [Cr(H2O)6]3+. The formula of this compound can be written more descriptively as [Cr(H2O)6]2(SO4)3·6H2O. Six of the eighteen water molecules in this formula unit are water of crystallization.
Hydrated chromium(III) sulfate, Cr2(SO4)3·15(H2O), (CAS #10031-37-5) is a green solid that also readily dissolves in water. It is obtained by heating the 18-hydrate material above 70 °C. Further heating yields the anhydrous sulfate.

A variety of other chromium(III) sulfates are known, but also contain hydroxide or oxide ligands. Most important commercially is basic chromium sulfate, which is thought to be [Cr2(H2O)6(OH)4]SO4 (CAS#39380-78-4).  It results from the partial neutralization of the hexahydrates. Other chromium(III) hydroxides have been reported.

Production
The most useful source of chromium(III) sulfate are the Cr(III) wastes from the chromate oxidation of various organic compounds. Anthroquinone and quinone are produced on large scale by treatment of anthracene and phenol with chromic acid. A chromium(III) oxide coproduct is generated which is readily extracted into sulfuric acid. Evaporation of these acidic solutions affords the hydrate salt described above. The hydrated salts of chromium sulfate can also be produced, albeit impure, by extraction of various other chromium compounds, but these routes are not economically viable.. Extraction of chromite ore with sulfuric acid in the presence of some chromate gives solutions of chromium(III) sulfate contaminated with other metal ions. Similarly, dissolution of chrome alloys gives chromium sulfate together with ferrous sulfate.

Basic chromium(III) sulfate
Basic chromium sulfate is produced from chromate salts by reduction with sulfur dioxide, although other methods exist. The reduction could formally be written:
Na2Cr2O7 + 3 SO2 + H2O → Cr2(SO4)3 + 2 NaOH

Since 33% of the anion charges are due to hydroxy ions the basicity is 33% (but in tanning jargon it is known as 33% reduced). Products with higher basicities, e.g. 42% or 50% may be obtained by the addition of sodium carbonate, these are often used in combination with sodium formate. The sodium sulfate is often left in the technical product since it is inert with respect to the tanning process. It is important to fully reduce the hexavalent chromium to trivalent since the hexavalent is more likely to cause health problems for tanners and leather consumers.

Natural occurrence
Pure chromium(III) sulfate, both in anhydrous and hydrous form, is as yet (2020) unknown among mineral species. There are 3 complex minerals being, in part, Cr(III) sulfates: bentorite, reddingtonite, and ptnisite.

References

Chromium(III) compounds
Sulfates